Finality may refer to:

 Extrinsic finality
 Intrinsic finality
 Finality (law)
 Teleology

See also
Final (disambiguation)